Senna auriculata is a leguminous tree in the subfamily Caesalpinioideae. It is commonly known by its local names matura tea tree, avaram or ranawara , ( āvarike, Marathi: तरवड, Malayalam: ആവര,  ranawarā, taṃgēḍu,  āvārai) or the English version avaram senna. It is the State flower of Indian state of Telangana.
It occurs in the dry regions of India and Sri Lanka. It is common along the sea coast and the dry zone in Sri Lanka.

Description

Avaram senna is a much branched shrub with smooth cinnamon brown bark and closely pubescent branchlets.

The leaves are alternate, stipulate, paripinnate compound, very numerous, closely placed, rachis 8.8-12.5 cm long, narrowly furrowed, slender, pubescent, with an erect linear gland between the leaflets of each pair, leaflets 16-24, very shortly stalked 2-2.5 cm long 1-1.3 cm broad, slightly overlapping, oval oblong, obtuse, at both ends, mucronate, glabrous or minutely downy, dull green, paler beneath, stipules very large, reniform-rotund, produced at base on side of next petiole into a filiform point and persistent.

Its flowers are irregular, bisexual, bright yellow and large (nearly 5 cm across), the pedicels glabrous and 2.5 cm long. The racemes are few-flowered, short, erect, crowded in axils of upper leaves so as to form a large terminal inflorescence stamens barren; the ovary is superior, unilocular, with marginal ovules.

The fruit is a short legume, 7.5–11 cm long, 1.5 cm broad, oblong, obtuse, tipped with long style base, flat, thin, papery, undulately crimpled, pilose, pale brown. 12-20 seeds per fruit are carried each in its separate cavity.

Uses

Gardens 
Senna auriculata is suitable for landscaping roadways and home gardens. It tolerates drought and dry conditions, but not much cold. The flowers in racemes are also attractive.

Medicinal uses 
The plant has been reported to treat hyperglycemia and associated hyperlipidemia

This plant is said to contain a cardiac glucoside (sennapicrin) and sap, leaves and bark yield anthraquinones, while the latter contains tannins.

The root is used in decoctions against fevers, diabetes, diseases of urinary system and constipation. The leaves have laxative properties. The dried flowers and flower buds are used as a substitute for tea in case of diabetes patients. It is also believed to improve the complexion. The powdered seed is also applied to the eye, in case of chronic purulent conjunctivitis. In Africa the bark and seeds are said to give relief in rheumatism, eye diseases, gonorrhea, diabetes and gout.

The plant has been shown to have antibacterial activity in the laboratory.

References

Footnotes
  (1981): A Revised Handbook to the Flora of Ceylon (Vol. II). Smithsonian Institution and National Science Foundation, Washington D.C., Amerind Publishing Co Pvt Ltd, New Delhi.
  (1998): A selection of indigenous trees for traditional landscapes in Sri Lanka. Deveco Designers and publishers (Pvt) Ltd.
  (1981a): Medicinal plants (indigenous and exotic) used in Ceylon (Part I). The National Science Council of Sri Lanka, Colombo 7.
  (1981b): Medicinal plants (indigenous and exotic) used in Ceylon (Part II). The National Science Council of Sri Lanka, Colombo 7.
  (1981c): Medicinal plants (indigenous and exotic) used in Ceylon (Part III). The National Science Council of Sri Lanka, Colombo 7.
  (1982): Medicinal plants (indigenous and exotic) used in Ceylon (Part IV). The National Science Council of Sri Lanka, Colombo 7.
  (1992): Medicinal plants (indigenous and exotic) used in Ceylon (Part V). The National Science Council of Sri Lanka, Colombo 7.
  (1983): Landscape Plants in Design: A Photographic Guide . AVI Publishing Company, Westport, Connecticut. 
  (2002): Compendium of Medicinal plants. A Sri Lankan study (Vol. 1+2). Ayurvedic Department, Sri Lanka.
  (1999): Field Guide on Medicinal Plants. Forest Department, Andhra Pradesh, India.
  (2007): USDA Plants Profile: Cassia auriculata. Retrieved 2007-DEC-20.

External links
 Cassia auriculata
 Cassia auriculata L.
 Ranawara Tea

auriculata
Medicinal plants
Plants described in 1753
Taxa named by Carl Linnaeus